Kai Aage Krarup (22 April 1915 – 14 April 2013) was a Danish equestrian who competed in the 1948 Summer Olympics. He died in April 2013 at the age of 97.

References

1915 births
2013 deaths
Danish male equestrians
Equestrians at the 1948 Summer Olympics
Olympic equestrians of Denmark